Alice French House may refer to:

Alice French House (Clover Bend, Arkansas), formerly listed on the National Register of Historic Places (NRHP) in Lawrence County
Alice French House (Davenport, Iowa), NRHP-listed, in Scott County

See also
French House (disambiguation)